The 22nd Alberta Legislative Assembly was in session from June 1, 1989, to May 18, 1993, with the membership of the assembly determined by the results of the 1989 Alberta general election held on March 20, 1989. The Legislature officially resumed on June 1, 1989, and continued until the fourth session was prorogued and dissolved on May 18, 1993, prior to the 1993 Alberta general election on June 15, 1993.

Alberta's twenty-second government was controlled by the majority Progressive Conservative Association of Alberta, led by Premier Don Getty until his resignation, he was replaced by Ralph Klein. The Official Opposition was led by Ray Martin of the New Democratic Party.  The Speaker was David J. Carter.

Party standings after the 22nd General Election

Fourth Sitting Speech from the Throne
In an unusual move, Lieutenant Governor Gordon Towers would announce the Fourth Sitting of the 22nd Alberta Legislature would open with a "90 minute state-of-affairs address" rather than the traditional Speech from the Throne. Towers' reasoning for the change was the session would only last a couple weeks until the 1993 Alberta general election would be called.

Members elected
For complete electoral history, see individual districts

Note: 
1 Nancy Betkowski later changed her last name to MacBeth
2 Pat Black later changed her last name to Nelson

References

Further reading

External links
Alberta Legislative Assembly
Legislative Assembly of Alberta Members Book
By-elections 1905 to present
 Source of election results

22